Neotibicen superbus, the superb dog-day cicada, is a species of cicada in the family Cicadidae. It is the greenest cicada in the neotibicen genus. It has reduced black patterning and looks different than most other cicadas in its genus. Its song is a soft buzz that reaches a crescendo.

References

Further reading

External links

 
 

Insects described in 1855
Cryptotympanini